Carlia inconnexa, the Whitsunday rainbow skink, is a species of skink in the genus Carlia. It is endemic to Whitsunday, Hook, and Lindeman Island in Australia.

References

Carlia
Reptiles described in 1989
Endemic fauna of Australia
Skinks of Australia
Taxa named by Glen Joseph Ingram
Taxa named by Jeanette Covacevich